Pyrrhalta is a genus of beetles in the leaf beetle family, Chrysomelidae. Species are distributed throughout much of the world, including much of the Northern Hemisphere and the Australian region.

The taxonomy of the genus is not clear. Species are separated from those of other genera by the sometimes inconsistent comparison of questionable characters, such as the distribution of minute hairs. There is also little agreement on how to divide the group into subgenera. Former subgenera such as Xanthogaleruca are treated as separate genera by some authors, but not accepted as such by others.

A definition of the genus used by some authors includes characters such as a hairy pronotum and elytra, gena (the spaces below the eyes) longer than the eyes themselves, and a labrum with a line of hairy pores.

This is one of the largest genera of the leaf beetle subfamily Galerucinae, with about 111 to 115 species.

A number of Pyrrhalta are considered pests. The species Pyrrhalta viburni has received attention as a Eurasian beetle introduced to North America with the potential to do significant damage to native and cultivated viburnum plants.

Species include:
Pyrrhalta annulicornis
Pyrrhalta aurata
Pyrrhalta brevicornis
Pyrrhalta ceylonensis
Pyrrhalta darjeelingensis
Pyrrhalta digambara
Pyrrhalta esakii
Pyrrhalta fuscipennis
Pyrrhalta huangshana
Pyrrhalta humeralis
Pyrrhalta indica
Pyrrhalta lineola
Pyrrhalta maculata
Pyrrhalta maculicollis
Pyrrhalta martensi
Pyrrhalta medvedevi
Pyrrhalta meghalayana
Pyrrhalta metallica
Pyrrhalta nila
Pyrrhalta orientalis
Pyrrhalta prokofievi
Pyrrhalta quianana
Pyrrhalta scutellata
Pyrrhalta subaeanea
Pyrrhalta sulcatipennis
Pyrrhalta tatesuji
Pyrrhalta tianmuensis
Pyrrhalta viburni - viburnum leaf beetle
Pyrrhalta warchalowskii
Pyrrhalta xizangana

See also
Xanthogaleruca luteola - elm leaf beetle

References

Galerucinae
Chrysomelidae genera